In mathematics, especially algebraic geometry, the Bass conjecture says that certain algebraic K-groups are supposed to be finitely generated. The conjecture was proposed by Hyman Bass.

Statement of the conjecture
Any of the following equivalent statements is referred to as the Bass conjecture.
 For any finitely generated Z-algebra A, the groups K'n(A) are finitely generated (K-theory of finitely generated A-modules, also known as G-theory of A) for all n ≥ 0.
 For any finitely generated Z-algebra A, that is a regular ring, the groups Kn(A) are finitely generated (K-theory of finitely generated locally free A-modules).
 For any scheme X of finite type over Spec(Z), K'n(X) is finitely generated.
 For any regular scheme X of finite type over Z, Kn(X) is finitely generated.

The equivalence of these statements follows from the agreement of K- and K'-theory for regular rings and the localization sequence for K'-theory.

Known cases
Daniel Quillen showed that the Bass conjecture holds for all (regular, depending on the version of the conjecture) rings or schemes of dimension ≤ 1, i.e., algebraic curves over finite fields and the spectrum of the ring of integers in a number field.

The (non-regular) ring A = Z[x, y]/x2 has an infinitely generated K1(A).

Implications
The Bass conjecture is known to imply the Beilinson–Soulé vanishing conjecture.

References

 , p. 53

Algebraic geometry
Algebraic K-theory
Unsolved problems in geometry